Jabir Amirli (born 6 January 1997) is an Azerbaijani footballer who plays as a defender for Neftçi Baku in the Azerbaijan Premier League.

Club career
On 24 April 2017, Amirli made his debut in the Azerbaijan Premier League for Keşla match against Gabala.

Honours
Keşla
 Azerbaijan Cup: 2017–18

References

External links
 

1997 births
Living people
Association football defenders
Azerbaijani footballers
Azerbaijan youth international footballers
Azerbaijan under-21 international footballers
Azerbaijan Premier League players
Shamakhi FK players
Neftçi PFK players